Saudakent, known as Baikadam until 1993, is a town located in the Sarysu District, Zhambyl Region, Kazakhstan. It is part of Baikadam rural district (КАТО code — 316033100).

Demographics 
According to the 2009 Kazakhstan census, the town has a population of 5313 people. In 1999 the town had a population of 5864.

Geography

References

Populated places in Jambyl Region

ru:Саудакент